Sondhi may refer to:

Surname 
Guru Dutt Sondhi (1890–1966), founder of the Asian Games Federation (AGF)
Man Mohan Sondhi (1933–2018), speech processing researcher at Bell Labs
Manohar Lal Sondhi (1933–2003), member of Lok Sabha
Maya Sondhi, British-Asian television actress
Ranjit Sondhi, BBC Governor
Shivaji Sondhi, Indian-born theoretical physicist

Name 
Sondhi Limthongkul, Thai media mogul and activist
Sondhi Boonyaratkalin, former Commander-in-Chief of the Royal Thai Army

See also 
 Sonthi (disambiguation)